Lepidochitona is a genus of chitons. It has been included in the families Tonicellidae, Ischnochitonidae, and Lepidochitonidae.

L. raymondi is the only hermaphroditic polyplacophoran.

There are many fossil species in the genus, as well as species extant today.

Species include:
Lepidochitona aleutica
Lepidochitona bullocki
Lepidochitona caboverdensis
Lepidochitona canariensis
Lepidochitona caprearum
 † Lepidochitona chalossensis Dell'Angelo, Lesport, Cluzaud & Sosso, 2020 
Lepidochitona cinerea
Lepidochitona dicksae
Lepidochitona furtiva
Lepidochitona iberica
Lepidochitona kaasi
Lepidochitona liozonis
Lepidochitona monterosatoi
Lepidochitona piceola
Lepidochitona rolani
Lepidochitona rosea
Lepidochitona rufoi
Lepidochitona salvadorensis
Lepidochitona severianoi
Lepidochitona simrothi
Lepidochitona stroemfelti
Lepidochitona subaleutica
Lepidochitona turtoni

References

Ischnochitonidae
Chiton genera